Robert Himgi (22 August 1922 – 8 November 2012) was a French water polo player. He competed in the men's tournament at the 1948 Summer Olympics.

References

External links
 

1922 births
2012 deaths
French male water polo players
Olympic water polo players of France
Water polo players at the 1948 Summer Olympics
Place of birth missing